Summer of Rockets  is a six-episode British Cold War television miniseries, which premiered on BBC Two in the United Kingdom on 22 May 2019. The series was written and directed by Stephen Poliakoff and stars Keeley Hawes, Linus Roache, Timothy Spall and Toby Stephens. It is a semi-autobiographical story based on Poliakoff's childhood and his father, Alexander Poliakoff.

Plot
Samuel Petrukhin, a Russian-born Jewish inventor living in England, is given a secret mission by MI5. Samuel, who specialises in the development of hearing aids, is asked to use his expertise to contribute to western Cold War efforts. Following the tensions of the Space Race and the first hydrogen bomb test, Samuel's work plays a part in the emergence of the modern world.

Cast
Toby Stephens as Samuel Petrukhin
Keeley Hawes as Kathleen Shaw
Timothy Spall as Lord Arthur Wallington
Linus Roache as Richard Shaw MP
Lily Sacofsky as Hannah Petrukhin
Toby Woolf as Sasha Petrukhin
Lucy Cohu as Miriam Petrukhin
Gary Beadle as Courtney Johnson
Mark Bonnar as Field
Suanne Braun as Matron Jeffry
Ronald Pickup as Walter
Rose Ayling-Ellis as Esther
Greg Austin as Anthony Shaw
Jordan Coulson as Kevin
Matthew James Thomas as Nicolas Halliday
Fode Simbo as Joel
Claire Bloom as Aunt Mary
Leo Staar as Denning
Adrian Edmondson as Max Dennis

Episodes

Production

Development
Summer of Rockets was originally announced in May 2017 alongside two other BBC commissions, which were 2017's Little Women and 2018's A Very English Scandal. In May 2018, Keeley Hawes, Toby Stephens, Timothy Spall and Linus Roache were announced as joining the project.

Filming
Filming began in Oxford and in London in May 2018. Filming also took place in Stevenage, Hertfordshire in July 2018 at Benington Lordship, and at Reddam House, Berkshire in August. Filming also took place at The Royal Masonic School for Girls in Rickmansworth, Hertfordshire in August 2018 and at the former RAF Upper Heyford air base in Oxfordshire.

The streets outside the Ropery at the Chatham Dockyard in Kent were used to film the 1950s civil defence exercise in the series and the upper floors of the Ropery itself featured as civil defence training rooms.

Reception
Writing for The Guardian, Emine Saner gave the first episode four stars out of five. The Times gave it three stars out of five, praising the production but found it inconsistently engaging. The Evening Standard found the episode 'hammy' but complimented the acting and mystery.

References

External links

2010s British drama television series
2019 British television series debuts
2019 British television series endings
2010s British television miniseries
BBC television dramas
English-language television shows
Television series set in the 1950s
Television series set in 1958
Television shows set in the United Kingdom